The Men's team pursuit event of the 2008 UCI Track Cycling World Championships was held on 27 March 2008.

Results

Qualifying

Finals

References

External links
 Full results at Tissottiming.com

Men's team pursuit
UCI Track Cycling World Championships – Men's team pursuit